Easton is an unincorporated community in Monongalia County, West Virginia, United States.

The community most likely was so named on account of its location east of Morgantown.

References 

Unincorporated communities in West Virginia
Unincorporated communities in Monongalia County, West Virginia